New Brighton, South Africa is the name of several places:

 New Brighton, Gauteng
 New Brighton, Eastern Cape